New Frontiers may refer to:

 New Frontiers program, a series of NASA planetary science exploration missions
 New Frontiers Science Park, a former GSK research centre in Harlow, Essex
 Newfrontiers, a network of churches
 New Frontiers Entrepreneur Development Programme, an Enterprise Ireland funded entrepreneur development programme